The 1991 Men's European Volleyball Championship was the seventeenth edition of the event, organized by Europe's governing volleyball body, the Confédération Européenne de Volleyball. It was hosted in Hamburg and Berlin, Germany from September 7 to September 15, 1991.

Teams

Group A – Hamburg
 
 
 
 
 
 

Group B – Berlin

Preliminary round

Final round

Final ranking

References
 Results

Men's European Volleyball Championships
E
Volleyball Championship
V
Volleyball
V
1991 in Berlin
1990s in Hamburg